Tomislav Jagurinovski (born 19 August 1998) is a Macedonian handball player who plays for RK Vardar 1961 and the Macedonian national team.

He participated at the 2017 Men's Junior World Handball Championship.

Honors 
RK Metalurg Skopje 
 Macedonian Handball Cup
 Winner:2019
RK Vardar 
 Macedonian Handball Super League
 Winner:2021
 Macedonian Handball Cup
 Winner:2021

References
https://rkmetalurg.mk/metalurg-se-zasili-so-trojca-rakometari/
http://sportmedia.mk/rakomet/domashna-liga/srbija-ni-go-krade-kadetskiot-biser-jaugrinovski
https://ekipa.mk/krstevski-i-jagurinovski-na-pozajmitsa-vo-rabotnik/
https://www.mkd.mk/sport/rakomet/filip-lazarov-potpisha-za-pelister
https://sportmedia.mk/2020/05/14/%d1%98%d0%b0%d0%b3%d1%83%d1%80%d0%b8%d0%bd%d0%be%d0%b2%d1%81%d0%ba%d0%b8-%d0%bf%d0%be%d1%82%d0%bf%d0%b8%d1%88%d0%b0-%d0%b7%d0%b0-%d0%b2%d0%b0%d1%80%d0%b4%d0%b0%d1%80/

1998 births
Living people
Macedonian male handball players
Sportspeople from Skopje